This is the progression of world record improvements of the triple jump M40 division of Masters athletics.

Key

See also
World records in masters athletics - Triple jump

References

External links
Masters Athletics Triple Jump list

Masters athletics world record progressions
Triple jump